The first season of Jane the Virgin premiered on The CW on October 13, 2014 and ended on May 11, 2015. The season consisted of 22 episodes and stars Gina Rodriguez as a young Latina university student accidentally artificially inseminated with her boss' sperm, Rafael Solano (Justin Baldoni). For her performance, Rodriguez won the Golden Globe Award for Best Actress – Television Series, Musical or Comedy.

Cast and characters

Main
 Gina Rodriguez as Jane Gloriana Villanueva
 Andrea Navedo as Xiomara "Xo" Gloriana Villanueva
 Yael Grobglas as Petra Solano
 Justin Baldoni as Rafael Solano
 Ivonne Coll as Alba Gloriana Villanueva
 Brett Dier as Michael Cordero, Jr.
 Jaime Camil as Rogelio de la Vega

Recurring
 Yara Martinez as Dr. Luisa Alver
 Bridget Regan as Rose Solano / Sin Rostro
 Carlo Rota as Emilio Solano
 Michael Rady as Lachlan
 Diane Guerrero as Lina Santillan
 Azie Tesfai as Detective Nadine Hansan
 Brian Dare as Luca
 Alano Miller as Roman Zazo
 Priscilla Barnes as Magda

Episodes

Production and development
On June 27, 2013, American television network The CW announced that it was planning to release a new show based on the Venezuelan soap opera Juana La Virgen. On February 23, 2014, Entertainment Weekly announced that Rodriguez would play the title role of Jane Villanueva. On May 8, 2014, during The CW's 2014–2015 upfronts, the series was officially picked up. On July 18, 2014, an extended trailer was released by The CW. On August 8, 2014, it was announced that White Collars Bridget Regan and Azie Tesfai would join the series as respectively Rose, a former lawyer, and Detective Nadine Hansan, a police detective and rival to Dier's character. On August 10, 2014, TVLine announced that Melrose Place and Emily Owens, M.D. actor Michael Rady would join the series as Lachlan. Filming for season one commenced on July 28, 2014. The show is filmed on soundstages in Los Angeles and the pilot was filmed in Huntington Beach, California. On October 21, 2014, the show was given a full season order.

Ratings

Home media

References

2014 American television seasons 
2015 American television seasons